Sergey Shumilkin (born 30 October 1986) is a retired Russian badminton player. In 2013, he became the runner-up of White Nights tournament with his partner Viktoriia Vorobeva in mixed doubles event and Andrej Ashmarin in men's doubles event.

Achievements

BWF International Challenge/Series
Men's Doubles

Mixed Doubles

 BWF International Challenge tournament
 BWF International Series tournament
 BWF Future Series tournament

References

External links
 
 

1986 births
Living people
Russian male badminton players